Allison Christin Mack (born July 29, 1982) is an American actress. She played Chloe Sullivan on the superhero series Smallville (2001–2011) and had a recurring role on the comedy series Wilfred (2012–2014).

Mack was a member of NXIVM, a multi-level marketing company selling professional and personal development seminars, widely described as a cult. In 2018, federal authorities arrested Mack on charges of sex trafficking, sex trafficking conspiracy, and forced labor conspiracy related to her involvement in NXIVM and its subgroup, DOS. She pleaded guilty to racketeering and racketeering conspiracy charges and in 2021 was sentenced to three years in prison.

Early life
Mack was born on July 29, 1982, in Preetz, West Germany, to American parents Jonathan Mack, an opera singer, and Mindy Mack, a schoolteacher and bookkeeper. Her parents were in Germany at the time of her birth because Jonathan was performing there; they lived in Germany for two years before moving to California.

Career

Early work
Mack's first job was for a German chocolate company in a series of print ads and commercials. She went into modeling for a short period and studied at the Young Actors Space in Los Angeles at age seven.

Mack's first major television role was in an episode of the WB series 7th Heaven, in which she gained attention playing a teenager who cut herself. In 2000, she co-starred in the short-lived series Opposite Sex. Her film credits include roles in  My Horrible Year! (Eric Stoltz's directorial debut) as a girl having great difficulties in her life as she turns 16. She was also featured in Camp Nowhere and in the Disney film Honey, We Shrunk Ourselves.

Smallville

In October 2001, Mack began starring as Chloe Sullivan (an original character created for the show) one of Clark Kent's best friends in the WB/CW television series Smallville. Mack earned several awards and nominations for her portrayal of Chloe, including the Teen Choice Award for Best Sidekick in 2006 and 2007. She appeared as a series regular for nine seasons and returned as an intermittent main cast member in the tenth season, including the two-part series finale. From 2003 to 2006, Mack's character appeared in her own miniseries Smallville: Chloe Chronicles and Smallville: Vengeance Chronicles. In 2008, Mack made her directorial debut in Smallville season 8 episode "Power".

In 2002, she made a couple of appearances along with her Smallville castmate Sam Jones III in R. L. Stine's miniseries The Nightmare Room. In 2006, Mack appeared in the animated movie The Ant Bully. That same year, she voiced Clea, a museum curator, in an episode of The Batman. Adding to her Superman resume, she lent her voice for Power Girl in the animated feature Superman/Batman: Public Enemies (2009). Mack had been part of a project with the Iris Theatre Company.

After Smallville
In March 2012, Mack was cast in a recurring role in the second season of the FX sitcom Wilfred. She played Amanda, the love interest of Elijah Wood's lead character Ryan. Mack returned to Wilfred for one episode of the fourth and final season. In 2014, Mack guest-starred as a policewoman named Hilary in an episode of the Fox thriller The Following. On March 21, 2015, she tweeted that she would be appearing in American Odyssey as Julia, who befriends Suzanne, the daughter of Anna Friel's lead character Sgt. Odelle Ballard.

Personal life
Mack had a long-term relationship with actor Chad Krowchuk during the 2000s. Mack married Canadian actress Nicki Clyne, a NXIVM member, in February 2017. The marriage was alleged to have been a sham to get Clyne around US immigration laws and only became public a year later during legal proceedings on the conspiracy and racketeering charges as part of Mack's involvement with NXIVM. In December 2020, Mack filed for divorce from Clyne. Mack and Clyne were both also NXIVM founder Keith Raniere's sexual partners. It was reported in 2020 that Mack had attended classes at UC Berkeley.

Involvement with NXIVM and fallout
Mack was a member of NXIVM, a now defunct multi-level marketing company founded by Keith Raniere and headquartered in Albany, New York. In a 2003 article from Forbes, advocates of NXIVM portrayed it as an organization focused on inspirational executive coaching, "like a practical MBA", while detractors accused the founder Keith Raniere of running "a cult-like program aimed at breaking down his subjects psychologically".

NXIVM and DOS
In 2006, Mack joined NXIVM after attending a two-day introduction to "Jness", a women's group within NXIVM. Mack eventually became a high-ranking member of the NXIVM organization. Mack was the co-creator of "The Source", a NXIVM program that recruited actors. Mack was a member of "Simply Human", a cappella NXIVM singing group. She was also the emcee of "A Capella Innovations", a multi-day festival. Hosted by NXIVM in 2007 and 2008, the events were billed as a university singing showcase and were alleged to be "a front to draw impressionable undergrads into NXIVM." 

In 2015, Raniere created a secret subgroup within NXIVM called "Dominus Obsequious Sororium" (DOS). Mack was allegedly second in command of DOS after Raniere. DOS was structured as a pyramid group with Raniere at the top (and the only man in DOS) with subordinates including Mack, Nicki Clyne and others as Raniere's inner circle. DOS was ostensibly built around female empowerment but mainly provided a means to traffic women for Raniere's gratification. According to prosecutors, Mack and others recruited women by telling them they were joining a women-only organization that would empower them, with Raniere's status as the leader of DOS concealed from new recruits. As a pre-condition for joining DOS, women were required to provide "collateral", which included nude photographs, damaging information about family and friends and rights to recruit's assets. Recruits were told their collateral could be released if they left DOS or told anyone about DOS's existence. Recruits were also controlled in several other ways, including requirements to seek permission, physical isolation, forced participation in "readiness drills", sleep deprivation, extremely restrictive diets, and being subject to corporal punishment.

Mack reportedly recruited four women into DOS, including India Oxenberg, daughter of actress Catherine Oxenberg. As directed by Raniere, Mack and others required their recruits to be branded with a symbol represening Raniere's initials, with the branding ritual following a script created by Raniere. Mack's recruits were unaware the brand was Raniere's initials and said that Mack told them the brand was a symbol of the four elements: air, earth, fire and water. Former NXIVM member Sarah Edmondson stated in a 2017 New York Times exposé and a 2018 A&E special on cults details DOS and that she had been branded in an initiation ceremony at Mack's house, under Mack's supervision. In a New York Times interview, Mack claimed that the human branding was her idea.

Arrest and arraignment

On April 20, 2018, Mack was arrested by the FBI in Brooklyn on charges of sex trafficking, sex trafficking conspiracy and forced labor conspiracy. The federal indictment accused Mack of "recruiting women to join what was purported to be a female mentorship group that was, in fact, created and led by Keith Raniere." Mack was one of the "top members of a highly organized scheme which was designed to provide sex to [Raniere]." Prosecutors accused Mack of concealing Raniere’s status as the leader of DOS as she coaxed recruits to provide highly damaging personal information, nude photos and rights to personal assets. After Mack recruited women to join DOS, "under the guise of female empowerment, she starved women until they fit [Raniere’s] sexual feminine ideal." Mack directly or implicitly required her recruits to engage in sexual activity with Raniere. In exchange, Mack received financial and other benefits from Raniere.

On April 24, 2018, Mack was released from Metropolitan Detention Center, Brooklyn on a $5 million bond and held under house arrest under the custody of her parents in California. During Mack's arraignment proceedings, prosecutors also accused her of entering a sham marriage with Nicki Clyne to help Clyne circumvent US immigration laws. India Oxenberg, a witness at Mack and Clyne's wedding ceremony, confirmed the marriage was fake and orchestrated by Raniere to keep Clyne in the United States.

Guilty plea and sentencing
Under the original indictment, Mack faced a minimum of 15 years to life in prison if found guilty. In March 2019, it was revealed in court that Mack and the other defendants in the case were in "active plea negotiations" as Raniere appeared in court to plead not guilty to additional child pornography charges related to the case. 

According to a filing by the United States Attorney for the Eastern District of New York, Mack sat down for proffer sessions to assist the government in the prosecution of Raniere starting in April 2019: "Mack detailed Raniere’s role in devising assignments for Mack’s “slaves,” including, among other things, Raniere’s repeated requests for nude photographs from Mack’s DOS “slaves”; Raniere’s instructions regarding the “seduction” assignment; and Raniere’s encouragement of the use of demeaning and derogatory language, including racial slurs, to humiliate DOS “slaves.” Mack also provided information regarding Clare Bronfman’s attempts to harass and threaten DOS victims, as well as Bronfman’s efforts to initiate a criminal cybercrime investigation against an individual Bronfman believed to be critical of Raniere and Nxivm. Mack also provided relevant emails, documents and recordings to the government." The U.S. Attorney also credited Mack with providing a recording in which Raniere provided a detailed script of how he wanted the branding ceremony conducted, and was later entered as evidence in Raniere's trial as proof that Raniere was the leader of DOS.

On April 8, 2019, Mack pleaded guilty to racketeering and racketeering conspiracy charges and admitted to state law extortion and forced labor. In June 2019, Raniere was found guilty on all charges and was sentenced to 120 years in October 2020. Though Mack was not called to testify and her cooperation undisclosed to the public, it was disclosed to Raniere himself (pursuant to his rights under the Jencks Act).  

The COVID-19 pandemic in the United States delayed court proceedings, including the sentencings of Mack and other NXIVM defendants. In 2021, prosecutors began the process of sentencing Mack. Under advisory sentencing guidelines, Mack faced 14 to 17.5 years behind bars. The U.S. Attorney credited Mack with providing "detailed and highly corroborated information" but also noted that Mack could have provided even more substantial assistance had she made the decision to cooperate earlier and requested that Judge Nicholas Garaufis impose a sentence below the applicable guidelines range. In his own sentencing memorandum, Judge Garaufis recognized several factors allowing for a downward departure but felt he could not avoid sending Mack to prison stating: "I agree with the Government, and with your lawyers, that a downward departure from the Guidelines range is warranted in this case. A sentence even in the lower end of that range would be much greater than necessary. At the same time, for the reasons I have explained, I believe that the nature and consequences of your offense and the need for deterrence warrant a serious sentence. While I accept your contrition as sincere and your efforts toward rehabilitation as genuine, it is impossible to ignore the tremendous injuries that you caused. For that reason, I believe that a carceral sentence is appropriate." 

Days before the sentencing, Mack released a statement saying that her involvement with NXIVM was "the biggest mistake and greatest regret of [her] life" and expressed remorse in regard to those affected. In addition to the letter, her attorneys asked for no jail time in consideration for Mack's remorse and her cooperation with Raniere's prosecution. 

On June 30, 2021, Judge Garaufis sentenced Mack to three years in prison and three years of probation, along with 1,000 hours of community service and a fine of $20,000. Mack reported to Federal Correctional Institution, Dublin, in Dublin, California, on September 13, 2021, to begin serving her three-year sentence.

Civil lawsuit
In January 2020, Mack, Raniere, Clyne and other NXIVM individuals were named as defendants in a civil lawsuit filed in federal court by 80 former NXIVM members. The lawsuit details allegations of fraud and abuse and charges of being a pyramid scheme, exploitation of its recruits, conducting illegal human experiments, and making it "physically and psychologically difficult, and in some cases impossible, to leave the coercive community."

Fictional portrayal 
In 2019, Catherine Oxenberg produced the Lifetime television film Escaping the NXIVM Cult: A Mother's Fight to Save Her Daughter with actress Sara Fletcher as Mack.

Filmography

Awards and nominations

References

External links

1982 births
20th-century American actresses
21st-century American actresses
21st-century American criminals
American female criminals
Actresses from Los Angeles
American child actresses
American film actresses
American television actresses
American voice actresses
Criminals from California
Living people
NXIVM people
People convicted of racketeering
People convicted of sex trafficking
Prisoners and detainees of New York (state)
People from Preetz